Thomas Varga is an American production sound mixer. He has been nominated an Academy Award in the category Best Sound Mixing. He also won a Cinema Audio Society award for best sound mixing for Birdman. He has worked on nearly 100 films since 1991.

Selected filmography
 Birdman (2014)

References

External links

Year of birth missing (living people)
Living people
American audio engineers